Shanoska Rozanne Young (born 26 April 1989) is a Jamaican footballer who plays as a forward for the Jamaica women's national team. She also holds an American passport.

College career
Young attended St. Thomas University and Nova Southeastern University, both in Florida, United States.

International career
Young capped for Jamaica at senior level during the 2014 CONCACAF Women's Championship.

References

1989 births
Living people
Sportspeople from Kingston, Jamaica
Jamaican women's footballers
Women's association football forwards
Maccabi Kishronot Hadera F.C. players
ŽNK Split players
Maccabi Holon F.C. (women) players
Ligat Nashim players
Croatian Women's First Football League players
Jamaica women's international footballers
Jamaican expatriate women's footballers
Jamaican expatriate sportspeople in Israel
Expatriate women's footballers in Israel
Jamaican expatriate sportspeople in Croatia
Expatriate women's footballers in Croatia
Jamaican emigrants to the United States
Naturalized citizens of the United States
Sportspeople from Pembroke Pines, Florida
Soccer players from Florida
American women's soccer players
St. Thomas University (Florida) alumni
Nova Southeastern Sharks women's soccer players
Women's Premier Soccer League players
African-American women's soccer players
American sportspeople of Jamaican descent
21st-century African-American sportspeople
21st-century African-American women
20th-century African-American people
20th-century African-American women